The 1970–71 Boston University Terriers men's ice hockey team represented Boston University in college ice hockey. In its 9th year under head coach Jack Kelley the team compiled a 28–2–1 record and reached the NCAA tournament for the seventh time. The Terriers defeated Minnesota 4–2 in the championship game at the Onondaga War Memorial in Syracuse, New York to win the national championship.

Season

Early Season
After a very good season in 1970, BU set their sights firmly on improving over their third place ECAC finish. Jack Kelley's Terriers opened the season in St. Louis, playing the new varsity team for Saint Louis University. Not surprisingly, the experienced easterners dominated the Billikens, winning both games by a combined score of 17–1. The squad returned home for their next contest three days later, defeating Brown soundly before hitting the road again (through not traveling nearly as far away as their first two games). After dropping New Hampshire BU faced Harvard in their first big test on the season and the two teams fought to a 4–4 draw. The Terriers returned to their home rink to take on two non-conference opponents and thoroughly dispatched both. First was College Division Merrimack followed by a down Minnesota team ten days later. BU Shut out both opponents and glided into their winter break with a 6–0–1 record.

Christmas Tournament
At the end of December BU played host in the Boston Arena Christmas Tournament for the 17th and final time. In the first game the Terriers dropped a good Providence team then beat the independent Notre Dame team 7–3 to claim the championship.

After the calendar changed to 1971, BU welcomed Princeton to the Boston Arena with the second-largest shutout victory in program history (14–0). After travelling across town to defeat arch-rival Boston College the Terriers returned home to face Northeastern on their shared rink. The Huskies were no match for Boston University and Kelley's boys posted their fifth shutout of the season.

After brushing off another College Division program, this time in the form of Bowling Green, BU hosted Dartmouth and trounced the Big Green 13–4, their sixth win by at least 8 goals in only 14 games.

First Blemish
In late January BU left New England for the first time in almost two months to face defending national champion Cornell. Cornell had not lost at home in over four years and, despite their best efforts, the first-place Terriers were unable to end the Big Red's streak, suffering their first loss of the season 1–5. BU took their frustrations out on Providence to begin another winning streak, defeating four conference opponents in quick succession (including second-place Clarkson) to head into the Beanpot narrowly holding onto the top spot in the ECAC.

BU's first opponent in the Beanpot was a very weak Northeastern team and the match was more or less a repeat of the first meeting between the two with the Terriers winning 12–2. Kelley's team played three games during the two-week break and won all three contests by a 5-goal margin. When the time came for the championship BU was able to hold Harvard to a single goal and won their second consecutive Beanpot.

ECAC Tournament
The Terriers finished their regular season with two more wins, finishing with an 18–1–1 ECAC record while possessing the top offense and #2 defense in the 17-team conference. BU played host to Rensselaer in the conference quarterfinals and won the match easily, 11–0. When the tournament shifted to the Boston Garden BU faced Harvard in the semifinal and disaster struck, for the fourth year in a row the Terriers lost in the conference semis, losing 2–4 to their cross-town rivals. Ordinarily that would have meant that BU would not have an opportunity to make the NCAA tournament but because that was only the Terriers' second loss of the season there was a small chance that the selection committee would choose BU as the second eastern seed. To give them a better shot at the tournament the Terriers would have to defeat Cornell in the third place game.

Cornell got off to a fast start, scoring less than four minutes into the game but BU was able to tie the match in less than two minutes. The two teams exchanged goals three more times before the first period was over and Cornell led 3–2 after one. The Terriers tied the game early in the second and then Cornell got into penalty trouble. BU score two power play goals in a 5-minute span and took a 5–3 lead before Cornell got their own man-advantage marker with three minutes left in the second. BU reestablished the 2-goal margin 33 seconds later but the Big Red were able to cut close the gap with 14 seconds left in the middle frame. After allowing the fifth goal on 31 shots, Kelley pulled starter Dan Brady in favor of Tim Regan and the later responded by putting up a wall in front of the BU net. Cornell fired a further 13 shots in the third period but Regan turned away everything and BU skated to a 6–5 win and a third-place finish in the ECAC tournament, the team's first win over the Big Red in 45 years.

Unfortunately for BU, Harvard won the ECAC tournament, meaning that the selection committee would be choosing between runner-up Clarkson (28–4–1) and third-place BU (26–2–1). However, with BU having defeated the Golden Knights back on February 5 (the two team's only meeting), and Clarkson having lost to Bowling Green the committee chose to give the Terriers the nod.

NCAA tournament
Boston University returned to the national tournament after 4 years on the outside and faced Denver in the semifinal. BU had lost each of their previous four meetings but this year was different and the Terriers managed to triumph over the western powerhouse 4–2. BU reached the championship for the first time and met Minnesota for the second time that season. The Golden Gophers were the first team to reach the title tilt with a losing record (and remain the only squad to do so as of 2019) and had been relying on strong goaltending from Dennis Erickson from the start of postseason play. BU opened the scoring just past the five-minute mark with a power play goal from team captain Steve Stirling and shortly thereafter a slapshot from Bob Brown caught Erickson in an unprotected part of his knee and injured the goaltender. After an extended pause in the game Erickson remained in the game and continued to play well but allowed another goal before the first had ended and a second goal to Stirling on a breakaway in the middle frame. Brady, the BU starter, faced almost as many shots in the game but looked calm in the net, turning aside the 23 shots he faced through two periods.

In the third BU played a much more defensive game and limited Minnesota's chances. The game was beginning to look like another shutout for the terriers until Mike LaGarde was called for holding. While the Terriers managed to kill off the disadvantage the Golden Gophers continued to keep the pressure on and scored 5 seconds after the penalty had expired. With momentum having swung in their direction Minnesota went on the attack but Brady stood tall and kept the put out of the BU net. With just over two minutes remaining BU found themselves on a two-on-one and Ron Anderson was able to give the Terriers a three-goal lead. Dean Blais would score Minnesota's second goal with 16 seconds left in the contest but the game was effectively over and BU won their first national championship.

Dan Brady was named as the Tournament MOP  (the first American so honored since Barry Urbanski in 1960) and was named to the All-Tournament Team with Bob Brown, Don Cahoon and Steve Stirling. Both Brown and Stirling were named to the AHCA All-American East Team and were joined by John Danby on the All-ECAC Hockey First Team while Ric Jordan made the Second Team. Brown was also awarded the ECAC Hockey Rookie of the Year, an obvious choice perhaps with Brown having led all defensemen in scoring.

Standings

Schedule

|-
!colspan=12 style=";" | Regular Season

|-
!colspan=12 style=";" | 

|-
!colspan=12 style=";" | 

|-
!colspan=12 style=";" | 

|-
!colspan=12 style=";" |

Roster and scoring statistics

Goaltending statistics

1971 championship game

(E2) Boston University vs. (W2) Minnesota

References

Boston University Terriers men's ice hockey seasons
Boston University
Boston University
Boston University
Boston University
Boston University
Boston University
Boston University
Boston University